The Baumann family was a family of American architects who practiced in Knoxville, Tennessee, and the surrounding region, in the late 19th and early 20th centuries. It included Joseph F. Baumann (1844–1920), his brother, Albert B. Baumann, Sr. (1861–1942), and Albert's son, Albert B. Baumann, Jr. (1897–1952). Buildings designed by the Baumanns include the Mall Building (1875), the Church of the Immaculate Conception (1886), Minvilla (1913), the Andrew Johnson Building (1930), and the Knoxville Post Office (1934).

Joseph Baumann, the son of a carpenter, began working as an architect in Knoxville in 1872, when he designed the city's first opera house, Staub's Theatre. In 1887, his brother, Albert, became a full partner in the firm, which then began operating under the name, Baumann Brothers. Joseph left the firm in 1913, and Albert worked alone until 1922, when his son joined the firm, which then changed its name to Baumann and Baumann. The firm continued working under different partners following the death of Albert Baumann, Jr., in 1952. It currently operates as Kaatz Binkley Jones and Morris (KBJM).

The Baumanns have been called Knoxville's first architectural "dynasty."<ref name=neely>Jack Neely, Wallace Baumann, 1925–2009, Metro Pulse, 19 August 2009. Accessed at the Internet Archive, 2 October 2015.</ref> They designed many of the major buildings constructed in the city during the late 19th century. Several of their works, which range from downtown high-rises to suburban cottages, have been listed on the National Register of Historic Places.

 History 

William Baumann, the father of Joseph and Albert Baumann, Sr., was born in Kirchheimbolanden, Germany, and immigrated to America in the 1830s. In 1837, he married Catherine Schneider. The family briefly lived in Savannah, Georgia, where Baumann worked as a shipbuilder. By the 1840s, the family had moved to East Tennessee, where Baumann found ample work as a carpenter and house builder in various growing towns around the region. The Baumanns moved to Knoxville in 1855.

During the Civil War, the Baumann house, located on what was then the outskirts of town, was occupied by both Union and Confederate soldiers, and suffered considerable damage. Some of the Baumann children were sent to Charleston, Tennessee, to stay with family friends, while remaining family members hid out in the Second Presbyterian Church. After the war, Baumann and his sons continued working as carpenters, and helped to rebuild Knoxville.

 Joseph Baumann, 1872–1887 

Joseph Francis Baumann, the second son of William and Catherine Baumann, was born in Tellico Plains, Tennessee, on January 16, 1844. He initially worked in the carpentry trade alongside his father, but began listing his services as an architect in 1872. That year, he designed two important Knoxville landmarks, the Second Empire home of financier Charles McClung McGhee on Locust Street, and Staub's Theatre, the city's first opera house, on Gay Street.

In 1875, Baumann designed Odd Fellows Hall (now called the Mall Building, or Hotel St. Oliver) for confectioner Peter Kern, as well as the Third Presbyterian Church, of which the Baumanns were members. Other major commissions during this period included the Hattie House Hotel (1879), the East Tennessee National Bank (1886), and large mansions for businessmen such as C. J. McClung and James D. Cowan. One of Baumann's most well-known projects, the Church of the Immaculate Conception, was completed atop Summit Hill in 1886.

 Baumann Brothers, 1887–1913 

Joseph Baumann's younger brother, Albert Benjamin Baumann, was born in Knoxville on August 30, 1861. He joined Joseph's firm as a draftsman in 1882, and upon his promotion to full partner in 1887, the firm began operating under the name, "Baumann Brothers." This firm's early work included several large warehouses with ornamented storefronts on Jackson Avenue, campus buildings for the Holbrook Normal College and Baker-Himel School, and elaborate houses, such as Westwood on Kingston Pike and Park Place in Fountain City.

In the 1880s, Joseph Baumann helped renovate and expand Knoxville's first Market House, a one-story shed-like structure which occupied much of Market Square. The Baumanns subsequently designed an imposing two-story replacement for this building, which was completed in 1897. That same year, the Monroe County Courthouse in Madisonville was completed, one of several courthouses designed by the Baumanns. Later courthouses included the Blount County Courthouse (1906) in Maryville and the Washington County Courthouse (1912) in Jonesborough.

Joseph Baumann left the firm in 1913, and retired from the profession altogether in 1916. He died on April 20, 1920. Albert continued as the firm's sole principal for several years. His commissions included the expansion of Knoxville High School, the original design of which he had provided in 1910. He also remodeled the Charles McClung McGhee House (which had been one of his brother's first commissions in 1872) as a Masonic Temple in 1915.

 Baumann and Baumann, 1922–1952 

Albert's son, Albert "A.B." Baumann, Jr., was born in Knoxville on January 20, 1897. He studied architecture at the University of Pennsylvania under French-born architect Paul Cret, who is credited with spreading the Beaux-Arts style in America (Baumann's chief competitors, Charles I. Barber and Benjamin McMurry, also studied under Cret). In 1922, Albert, Jr., joined his father's firm, which then began operating under the name, "Baumann and Baumann."

One of Baumann and Baumann's largest projects was the Andrew Johnson Hotel, which was built in the late 1920s, and would remain Knoxville's tallest building for several decades. Another major undertaking was the U.S. Post Office (1934) on Main Street, a large neoclassical structure influenced by post office buildings designed by Paul Cret during the same period. The Baumanns designed several major schools for the county, including Park City Junior High (1927), Tyson Junior High (1936), and Central High School (now Gresham Middle School) and Fountain City Elementary School in 1931. All four still stand, and the latter two are still used as schools.

Albert Baumann, Sr., died on November 23, 1942, and Albert Baumann, Jr., died on September 19, 1952. Both are buried in Highland Memorial Cemetery. Joseph Baumann is buried in Old Gray Cemetery. Wallace Baumann, the son of Albert Baumann, Jr., remained active in Knoxville as a local historian until his death in 2009. KBJM, the successor to the Baumann firm, is currently based in Mt. Juliet, Tennessee.

 Works 

Several hundred structures in Knoxville alone have been attributed to Baumanns' firms. Over a dozen of these structures have been listed on the National Register of Historic Places, the most recent listing being Minvilla in 2010. Along with their architectural services, the Baumanns also supervised the construction of several notable Knoxville buildings, including the Knox County Courthouse and St. John's Cathedral (designed by J. W. Yost).

Joseph Baumann read trade magazines such as Inland Architecture and National Builder'', and frequently attended American Institute of Architects conventions, and was thus aware of the changes taking place in architecture during the 1880s and 1890s. His early designs were typically in the Second Empire and Early English Gothic styles. By the mid-1880s, however, he had transitioned to the more contemporary Victorian Gothic and Queen Anne styles.

List of works

Key 

 Designed by Joseph F. Baumann, 1872–1887

 Designed by Baumann Brothers (Joseph F. Baumann and/or Albert Baumann, Sr.), 1887–1913

 Designed by Baumann and Baumann, 1922–1952

 NRHP – Listed on the National Register of Historic Places, reference number given for individual listings, historic district given for contributing properties
 HABS – Documented by the Historic American Buildings Survey
 R – Remodeled by the Baumanns, with remodeling date given in the "Completed" column

See also 
 George Franklin Barber
 Thomas Hope
 Bruce McCarty

References

External links 

 KBJM Architects

People from Knoxville, Tennessee
Architecture firms of the United States
American families of German ancestry
Architects from Tennessee